Onosmodium virginianum, common names gravel-weed, wild Job's tears, false gromwell, and Virginia false-gromwell is perennial plant native to the eastern United States.

Conservation status
It is endangered in Connecticut, Maryland,  New Jersey, New York (state),  extirpated in Pennsylvania,  and as historical in Rhode Island.

References

Boraginoideae
Flora of the United States